Goyke is a surname. Notable people with the surname include:

Evan Goyke (born 1982), American attorney, academic, and politician
Gary Goyke (born 1947), American politician